The 2019 season is Haugesund's 10th season in the Tippeligaen following their promotion in 2009.

Season events
On 7 January, Eirik Horneland became manager of Rosenborg, with Jostein Grindhaug being announced as Haugesund's new manager the following day.

Squad

Out on loan

Transfers

Winter

In:

Out:

Summer

In:

Out:

Competitions

Eliteserien

Results summary

Results by round

Results

Table

Norwegian Cup

Final

Europa League

Qualifying rounds

Squad statistics

Appearances and goals

|-
|colspan="14"|Players away from Haugesund on loan:

|-
|colspan="14"|Players who left Haugesund during the season:
|}

Goalscorers

Clean sheets

Disciplinary record

References

FK Haugesund seasons
Haugesund